Atunyota Alleluya Akpobome, professionally known as Ali Baba, is a Nigerian stand-up comedian, master of ceremonies and actor.

Early life
Ali Baba was born in Warri, Delta State, Nigeria on 24 June 1965, to the royal family of Agbarha Otor. He is the first son of several children and spent his first 8 years in Warri.  His father is a retired soldier who served in Lagos.

Education
He attended Command Secondary School, Ipaja, Lagos ,and Ibru College Agbarha-Otor, Delta.  He attended Bendel State University (now Ambrose Alli University), Ekpoma and graduated with a degree in Religious Studies & Philosophy.

Career
After completing his academic degree in 1990, he relocated back to Lagos, to develop his comedic talent he discovered at the university.  Originally, he planned to study Law but decided he could be more successful by making people laugh than by defending them.

Professional career
He began his professional career performing at corporate events, appearing on television shows with Patrick Doyle, Charly Boy , and Danladi Bako, and making cameo appearances on radio shows with Bisi Olatilo, Sani Irabor, and Mani Onumonmu. He also worked with Prince Adedapo Benjamin Adelegan of DP Lekki Limited as executive assistant in 1991.

In 2014, Ali Baba started an annual comedy event called the 1 January concert. Comedians come up to review the events of the previous year and a first-class graduate from the preceding year receives an award.

In 2015 he started an event called Spontaneity; a quarterly event for budding comedians. Notable among the finalists of this competition is Woli Arole at the 2016 edition.

Ali Baba maintains the philosophy that his business is big enough for all who want to make comedy their chosen profession. As such, he supports, mentors, and presents several comedians helping to ensure that standards are maintained and professionalism encouraged.

Awards

Recognition
Ali Baba was inducted into the Johnnie Walker 'Striding Man' Society in 2009 which recognizes men who have achieved great strides in their chosen fields and who motivate and encourage others 

In 2012, he rang the Year End Closing Bell of the Nigerian Stock Exchange, the first Nigerian comedian to do so.

He is a Special Marshal of the Federal Road Safety Corps.

In March 2015, Ali Baba was featured on CNN African voices, speaking about his goal to professionalize and gain acceptance for Nigerian comedians.

In April 2018, Ali Baba received the Paul Harris Fellowship by Rotary International for his contribution to the Nigerian Comedy industry

Family
Ali Baba is married to Mary Akpobome Ali Baba has five children three girls and two boys.

Personal life
Ali Baba is an avid reader and enjoys painting. he survived covid-19.

Select filmography
My Guy (1998)
The Last 3 Digits (2014)
Head Gone (2014)
The Wedding Party (2016)
Alakada (2017)

See also
List of Nigerian comedians

References

External links 
 Xclusive Features on Ali Baba and other Nigerian comedians

Living people
1965 births
Nigerian male comedians
Ambrose Alli University alumni
Nigerian television personalities
Nigerian male film actors
Male actors from Warri
21st-century Nigerian male actors
Actors from Delta State
20th-century births
Nigerian stand-up comedians